The eighth and final season of the American reality television competition series HGTV Star premiered on June 9, 2013. The series had been renamed from "Design Star" for this new edition. David Bromstad returned for his second season as host, and Sabrina Soto joined the show, along with returning judges Vern Yip and Genevieve Gorder.

Designers

Age is at the time of the show's filming

Elimination Table

 (WINNER) The designer won the competition.
 (RUNNER-UP) The designer received second place.
 (WIN) The designer was selected as the winner of the episode's elimination challenge.
 (HIGH) The designer was selected as one of the top entries in the elimination challenge, but did not win.
 (IN) The designer advanced to the next challenge, but was not selected as a top nor a bottom entry in the elimination challenge.
 (LOW) The designer was selected as one of the bottom entries in the elimination challenge, but was not the final contestant to move on to the next round
 (LOW) The designer was selected as one of the bottom entries in the elimination challenge and was the final contestant to move on to the next round.
 (OUT) The designer was eliminated from the competition.

2013 American television seasons